Mignonette is the 2004 album by the American folk rock band The Avett Brothers. The album was written and produced by Seth Avett, Scott Avett, and Bob Crawford of The Avett Brothers with additional vocals from their sister Bonnie Avett Rini and their father Jim Avett, who wrote and performed "Signs" in the 1970s. The album was preceded by the February 2004 release of the single "Swept Away" and was released on the Ramseur Records label.

The album was named after an English yacht that sank in the 1880s off the Cape of Good Hope, leaving the crew of four stranded on a lifeboat. The cabin boy, Richard Parker, was killed and eaten by the others, two of whom were later put on trial and convicted of murder.

Track listing

Personnel 
 Seth Avett, Scott Avett, & Bob Crawford — Audio Production, Composer, Primary Artist, Producer
 Jim Avett — Composer of "Signs", Primary Artist
 Scott Avett — Design, Drawing, Layout Design
 Seth Avett — Design, Drawing, Layout Design, Violin
 Daniel Coston — Photography
 Patrick Gauthier — Audio Engineer, Keyboards, Vocals, Vocals (Background)
 Brent Lambert — Mastering
 Dolph Ramseur — Audio Production, Producer
 Bonnie Avett Rini — Vocals

References 

The Avett Brothers albums
2004 albums